Alyx Vance is a fictional character from Valve's Half-Life video game series. She is introduced as a non-playable, supporting character in Half-Life 2 (2004), accompanying the player's character, Gordon Freeman, throughout much of the game. She subsequently appears in a similar capacity in Half-Life 2: Episode One (2006) and Episode Two (2007), and as the titular protagonist of the VR game Half-Life: Alyx (2020).

Alyx is portrayed as a young woman in her mid-twenties of Afro-Asian descent, and is a prominent figure in the human resistance against the rule of the alien empire called the Combine and their human representative, Dr. Wallace Breen. She is the daughter of resistance leader Dr. Eli Vance, and becomes a close friend and ally of Gordon. She received highly positive reviews from critics.

Character design

Alyx's character uses a modified version of real-life actress Jamil Mullen's face, and her voice is performed by Merle Dandridge in Half-Life 2 and its episodes, and Ozioma Akagha in Half-Life: Alyx.

Alyx is the daughter of Dr. Eli Vance. Her mother, Azian Vance, who is of Asian descent, can be seen in a family photograph appearing in the games, but is not part of the story. Azian died during the Black Mesa incident (the event depicted in the first Half-Life game).

Alyx is a skilled hacker, adept at infiltrating Combine computer systems and reprogramming them. She also possesses a multi-purpose tool that uses an electric charge in order to bypass security systems, open locked doors, and re-program rollermines and automated turrets to attack enemies. Alyx is proficient with firearms, in particular the automatic pistol she commonly carries. At certain points in the game, she also wields a shotgun and mans a stationary sniper rifle. In addition, she has some skill in unarmed combat and will occasionally wrestle off or kick headcrab zombies. Alyx is also very athletic, capable of effortlessly jumping down obstacles and climbing up the side of buildings. Alyx is a generally friendly person, usually making optimistic remarks in dire situations. Rarely does she become hostile towards others, with the exception of Judith Mossman who betrayed the Resistance. She also has a caring side, asking Gordon to be careful when he goes into dangerous areas and feeling sorry for a traincar filled with sleeping Stalkers.

At times, Alyx shows a very fragile, scared side that she usually bottles up in order to maintain the situation. Alyx is also very educated, forming opinions on the Combine and the Resistance independently. She has also proven to be very calm yet stern during combat, helping out in any way she can. Alyx has proven to be skilled in shooting, climbing, hacking, and repairing machines and vehicles. She also has a sense of humor, as evidenced by the jokes she makes about the Combine or Gordon's silence.

Appearances
Alyx helps Gordon more frequently and directly than any other character in Half-Life 2. In the first chapter (Point Insertion), Alyx saves Gordon from Civil Protection forces when he is unarmed and not yet wearing his protective HEV suit. Later, in Black Mesa East, she gives Gordon the gravity gun and instructs Gordon in its use. During the chapter titled Entanglement, she helps search Nova Prospekt for her captured father, Eli. She fights alongside Gordon through a section of City 17 during the armed uprising in Anticitizen One, and provides indirect assistance to Gordon during the final confrontation with Dr. Breen in the final areas of the Citadel in Dark Energy.

In Black Mesa East, Alyx argues heatedly with Dr. Judith Mossman. Alyx's hostility towards Mossman is seemingly justified: Gordon and Alyx learn in Entanglement that Mossman has betrayed the resistance and given away the location of their hidden facility. Nevertheless, in Dark Energy, Dr. Mossman switches sides again and the two women finally make peace. In the ending scene of Half-Life 2, Alyx is with Gordon at the time of the dark energy explosion. The G-Man stops time to rescue Gordon and put him back into stasis, but leaves Alyx to her fate.

In Half-Life 2: Episode One, before the explosion can kill her, Alyx is rescued by Vortigaunts who also retrieve Gordon from the G-Man, leaving them both outside the Citadel. Together, they have to revisit the structure to slow the core's progression toward meltdown, delaying the explosion.  Alyx and Gordon stick together for most of Episode One, finally getting out of the zombie-infested underground station to the surface. They soon meet up with Barney Calhoun and make a push for a different train station, saving the remaining rebel members. Gordon and Alyx leave Barney on a separate train and jump on the last train heading out of the City just as the Citadel explodes.

In Half-Life 2: Episode Two, Alyx and Gordon travel to the White Forest Rocket Facility to deliver a crucial information packet stolen from the Citadel. Along the way, she is gravely wounded by a Combine Hunter. Healing her requires Gordon to make a dangerous trek through an Antlion colony to retrieve their "larval extract," an essential ingredient in the Vortigaunt healing process. As part of the healing process, her life is entwined with Gordon's. During this time, the G-Man appears to Gordon in a surreal "heart-to-heart" sequence and programs Alyx to tell her father to "prepare for unforeseen consequences."

Once Alyx awakens, she and Gordon resume their quest toward White Forest. During their second encounter with Hunters, Alyx resolves not to run from them again. Aside from the Hunters, Alyx and Gordon fight numerous Combine soldiers, zombies, a Hunter-Chopper, and have a chance encounter with a Combine Advisor. Upon arriving at White Forest, Alyx is reunited with her father, who suggests that Alyx and Gordon should have children together. She delivers the Combine data to Dr. Kleiner, who manages to decrypt it and discover that Judith Mossman has found the legendary Borealis, an icebreaker ship which has disappeared during teleportation experiments.

As Kleiner argues with Eli about what to do with the Borealis, the G-Man triggers her programming; she clearly retains no memory of it upon delivering the message. She arranges transport to the Borealis in the form of a vintage helicopter while Gordon fights off an invasion by Striders. After Kleiner and Magnusson successfully disable the Combine superportal, Alyx and Gordon prepare to board the helicopter. Just as they reach the hangar, however, two Advisors break in and restrain them along with Eli. One kills Eli while Alyx and Gordon remain helpless, but Dog arrives on the scene in time to save Alyx and Gordon. Alyx cries, embracing her father's body and whimpering "Please... don't leave me." The screen then fades to black and the credits roll, with her cries still audible for several seconds.

Alyx was also featured in a series of promotional images released by Valve spoofing an Apple Inc. commercial.

Alyx is the titular playable protagonist of the 2020 virtual reality game Half-Life: Alyx developed by Valve. The game follows a 19-year-old Alyx's story in City 17 five years before the events of Half-Life 2. Initially performing routine reconnaissance for the Resistance, Alyx is captured along with her father by the Combine after he discovers images relating to an apparent Combine superweapon called "the Vault." Russell, a Resistance mechanic, frees Alyx and sends her through the zombie-infested Quarantine Zone outside City 17 to rescue Eli. Along the way, Alyx meets an eccentric Vortigaunt who warns her of Eli's death in the future. Alyx manages to derail the train sending Eli to Nova Prospekt and with the help of the Vortigaunt narrowly rescues him before Eli sends her to find a way to disable the Vault. Through her journey they learn the Vault is not a superweapon but in fact a prison, which they infer based on the information they gather is made to contain Gordon Freeman. When Alyx reaches the Vault, however, she instead finds the G-Man, who in exchange for freeing him offers her a vision of the future: her father's death at White Forest. He grants her the power to kill the Advisor, thus saving Eli's life, but then reveals he was testing to prove her a worthy replacement for Gordon Freeman, who he has grown dissatisfied with for not following his directions. Against her pleas to let her go, he places her into stasis. These events lead to Eli's resurrection at White Forest five years later, but Alyx being removed from time.

Gameplay
Through parts of Half-Life 2 and almost the entirety of its sequels, Episode One and Episode Two, Alyx serves as an ally to the player, assisting in combat and allowing the player to progress by opening doors and removing other obstacles. Alyx's health quickly regenerates, allowing her to recover quickly and survive a fair amount of punishment. As long as the player does not deliberately avoid helping Alyx, it is difficult for her to be killed. Notably, while Gordon requires the use of the special HEV suit for protection, power, and other abilities, Alyx appears to need no such enhancement.

In Episode One, where Alyx's role as a companion is expanded upon, her artificial intelligence (AI) was designed specifically for co-operative play to complement the player's abilities. The developers described Alyx's programming for Episode One as a "personality code" as opposed to an "AI code", emphasizing the attention they gave to create a unique and believable companion. In addition, she was specially programmed to avoid performing too many mechanical or repetitive actions, such as repeating lines of dialogue or performing certain routines in combat situations.

Examples of this co-operative gameplay include combat in underground levels, where the player can use their flashlight to help Alyx spot and kill oncoming enemies, thereby conserving their own ammunition. Similarly, Alyx will often take up strategic positions and provide covering fire to keep the player safe while they travel to a certain area or perform certain actions.

Alyx's primary weapon in the games is a unique automatic pistol resembling a machine pistol in operation and a Glock-series pistol in appearance.  Alyx also wields a shotgun identical to the one available to the player in the later part of Episode One. She also uses the mounted Overwatch sniper rifles at various points in both Episode One and Episode Two. In Episode Two she can also fire while Gordon is driving a car if he is moving slowly enough.

Reception
Since she first appeared in Half-Life 2, Alyx Vance has received positive reviews for both her intelligence and her beauty, among other factors. GamesRadar named Alyx "Miss 2004" in the article about the sexiest new characters of the decade, adding that giving her the award required no debate amongst the staff and describing her as brainy and strong-willed, as well as "relentlessly up-beat, funny, and friendly" in the face of peril.  GameTrailers listed her at number five among top ten "gamer babes" in 2007. In 2008, Play magazine listed her as their favorite computer game female character in their sixth "Girls of Gaming" special, calling her "the best partner Gordon Freeman could ask for," That same year, Chip ranked Alyx  as the sixth top "girl of gaming". In its 2010 cover feature, Game Informer named Alyx Vance one of 30 characters "who defined a decade," adding that "in a medium where female characters too often exist solely for their romantic relationship with a male protagonist, Alyx is strong, independent, and awesome without making a point out of it." That same year, UGO.com listed her at number eight on the list of top "girls of gaming", stating that "there's just something about her that makes her unforgettable", noting her bond with the player and describing her as a "cute post-apocalyptic chick with short hair and a take-no-crap attitude, a rarity in this age of eye candy and cheeseball characterization." In 2013, she was ranked as the 31st greatest heroine in video game history by Complex, who called her "still one of the best female characters in games, more than half a decade after the debut of Half-Life 2." Entertainment Weeklys Darren Franich listed her as one of "15 Kick-Ass Women in Videogames", asserting that "The main character in Half-Life 2 is actually Gordon Freeman, but considering he's as silent as a mahogany credenza (and with about as much personality), resistance-fighter Alyx Vance helps bring some much needed energy to the proceedings."

In 2008, Topless Robot named her one of the 11 "most dignified videogame heroines", citing that while she was a secondary character she was still very prominent, though despite her strengths she fulfilled the cliche of a "summer movie heroine" That same year, GameDaily ranked her as 22nd among the "50 hottest game babes". In 2009, GamesRadar ranked her second in their list of the top seven tasteful game heroines, describing her as the "go-to girl for female leads", describing her as one of the most human female video game characters, as well listing her as one of the top 25 best new characters of the decade, again citing her head-strong attitude and pleasant personality, describing her as one of the first non-playable characters to deviate from the standard. In 2010, AfterEllen ranked her as the 18th "hottest" female video game character, while VideoGamer.com's Wesley Yin-Poole included her his 2010 list of top ten "video game crushes", stating: "The thing with Half-Life 2'''s Alyx was she was insanely realistic. So realistic, in fact, that as Gordon Freeman's relationship with her grew she became less like a video game companion and more like a real-life companion." In 2011, UGO.com ranked Alyx as the 33rd top "videogame hottie", stating that "Alyx has it all: brains, good looks, and a stinging personality that can keep the comers at bay."

Multiple publications included her among the best non-player characters (NPCs) and sidekick type characters in video games. In 2008, Bit-tech ranked her as the number one PC game NPC of all time, commenting, "What makes Alyx such a popular supporting character is how believable she manages to be even in the utterly sci-fi world of Half-Life. The brilliant animation of the character combines with the fabulous voice acting and witty script to create one of the most important characters in a computer game, ever." That same year, "brave, beautiful, loyal and a crack shot," Alyx topped The Telegraph's list of the greatest sidekicks in gaming history, adding that "you'll find it hard not to fall in love with one of the best characters in gaming, who is more than a mere sidekick." In 2011, ScrewAttack ranked her as the fourth best sidekick character in gaming, while Maximum PC also included "the sassy and fiery Alyx" on a similar list. That same year, Cheat Code Central ranked her as the second best video game sidekick, commenting that "Alyx isn't just an amazing sidekick, she's also a beautifully realized character." In 2013, Hanuman Welch of Complex ranked Alyx at sixth place on a list of video game sidekicks that deserve their own titles, stating that "video game characters have rarely felt as intuitive, brilliantly true-to-life and emotionally three-dimensional."

In 2013's BioShock Infinite, the player character's female companion Elizabeth was received extremely well, with the developers stating that "A.I. companions haven't been done well since Half-Life Alyx Vance," and sought to make Elizabeth as likable and supportive as Alyx was.

In 2020, an Alyx-inspired skin was added to the massive multiplayer online obstacle course battle royale game Fall Guys''.

See also
List of female action heroes and villains

References

External links
 Alyx Vance on Combine OverWiki, an external wiki

Black characters in video games
Female characters in video games
Fictional African-American people
Fictional Asian-American people
Fictional American people in video games
Fictional revolutionaries
Hackers in video games
Half-Life characters
Video game characters introduced in 2004
Video game protagonists
First-person shooter characters